The National Lottery Act 2006 (c 23) is an Act of the Parliament of the United Kingdom. It implemented those decisions contained in the National Lottery Licensing and Regulation and National Lottery Funding Decision Documents published on 3 July 2003, and in the Review Decision Document published on 26 November 2004, which required legislation.

Section 16 - Dissolution
Section 16(1) reads:

"Secretary of State"

This means one of Her Majesty's Principal Secretaries of State.

Order made under this section
The National Lottery Distributors Dissolution Order 2006 (S.I. 2006/2915)

Section 22 - Commencement
The following orders have been made under this section:
The National Lottery Act 2006 (Commencement No. 1) Order 2006 (S.I. 2006/2177 (C.73))
The National Lottery Act 2006 (Commencement No. 2 and Transitional Provisions) Order 2006 (S.I. 2006/2630 (C.89))
The National Lottery Act 2006 (Commencement No. 3) Order 2006 (S.I. 2006/3201 (C.113))
The National Lottery Act 2006 (Commencement No. 4) Order 2007 (S.I. 2007/539 (C.22))
The National Lottery Act 2006 (Commencement No. 5) Order 2010 (S.I. 2010/2 (C.1))

References
Halsbury's Statutes

External links
The National Lottery Act 2006, as amended from the National Archives.
The National Lottery Act 2006, as originally enacted from the National Archives.
Explanatory notes to the National Lottery Act 2006.

United Kingdom Acts of Parliament 2006
Lotteries